A rotary valve (also called rotary-motion valve) is a type of valve in which the rotation of a passage or passages in a transverse plug regulates the flow of liquid or gas through the attached pipes. The common stopcock is the simplest form of rotary valve. Rotary valves have been applied in numerous applications, including:

 Changing the pitch of brass instruments.
 Controlling the steam and exhaust ports of steam engines, most notably in the Corliss steam engine.
 Periodically reversing the flow of air and fuel across the open hearth furnace.
 Loading sample on chromatography columns.
 Certain types of two-stroke and four-stroke engines.
 Most hydraulic automotive power steering control valves.

Use in brass instruments

In the context of brass instruments, rotary valves are found on horns, trumpets, trombones, flugelhorns, and tubas. The cornet derived from the posthorn, by applying rotary valves to it in the 1820s in France. An alternative to a rotary valve trumpet would be piston valve trumpet. Many European trumpet players tend to favor rotary valves.

Trombone F attachment valves are usually rotary, with several variations on the basic design also in use, such as the Thayer axial flow valve and the Hagmann valve.

Rotary valve was first applied to the horn in 1824 by Nathan Adams (1783-1864) of Boston and patented in 1835 by Joseph Riedl.

Use in industry
Rotary valves for industrial manufacturing are often used in bulk material handling, dust collection or pneumatic conveying systems, depending on the application. The valve is used to regulate the flow of a product or material by maintaining a consistent flow rate suited to the process. Controlling the flow of material helps to prevent issues such as jamming, material leakage and damage to the valve itself. Typical applications are for feeding a weighed hopper or for feeding a mill that can be clogged by the product.

Valves are part of the material exchange process and work in metering or feeding applications, function as rotary airlocks, or provide a combination of airlock and metering functions.

A rotary valve in the pharmaceutical, chemical and food industry is used to dose and feed solid bulk products within the processes. Valves are also commonly used in construction, plastics, recycling, agriculture and forestry, or wherever material needs to be safely and efficiently conveyed from one point to another.

An airlock-type rotary valve receives and dispenses material from two chambers with different pressure levels. They seal air flow between the valve’s inlet and outlet to maintain a consistent pressure differential, which promotes efficient material flow. The valve’s pressurized chamber prevents foreign material from infiltrating the housing and keeps conveyed material from escaping the system.

Use in engine design

Four-stroke engines

The rotary valve combustion engine possesses several significant advantages over the conventional assemblies, including significantly higher compression ratios and rpm, meaning more power, a much more compact and light-weight cylinder head, and reduced complexity, meaning higher reliability and lower cost. As inlet and exhaust are usually combined special attention should be given to valve cooling to avoid engine knocking.

Rotary valves have been used in several different engine designs. In Britain, the National Engine Company Ltd advertised its rotary valve engine for use in early aircraft, at a time when poppet valves were prone to failure by sticking or burning.

In the end of 1930s, Frank Aspin developed a design with a rotary valve that rotated on the same axis as the cylinder bore, but with limited success.

US company Coates International Ltd has developed a spherical rotary valve for internal combustion engines which replaces the poppet valve system. This particular design is four-stroke, with the rotary valves operated by overhead shafts in lieu of overhead camshafts (i.e. in line with a bank of cylinders). The first sale of such an engine was part of a natural gas engine-generator.

Rotary valves are potentially highly suitable for high-revving engines, such as those used in racing sportscars and F1 racing cars, on which traditional poppet valves with springs can fail due to valve float and spring resonance and where the desmodromic valve gear is too heavy, large in size and too complex to time and design properly. Rotary valves could allow for a more compact and lightweight cylinder head design. They rotate at half engine speed (or one quarter) and lack the inertia forces of reciprocating valve mechanisms. This allows for higher engine speeds, offering approximately perhaps 10% more power. The 1980s MGN W12 F1 engine used rotary valves but never raced. Between 2002 and 2004 the Australian developer Bishop Innovation and Mercedes-Ilmor tested rotary valves for a F1 V10 engine.

Bishop Innovations' patent for the rotary valve engine was bought out by BRV Pty Ltd, owned by Tony Wallis, one of the valves original designers. BRV has constructed several functional motors using the rotary valve technology, such as a Honda CRF 450, which had greater torque at both low(17% increase) and high (9% increase) engine speeds, and also produced more brake horsepower up to around 30% more at functional engine speeds. The engine was also considerably smaller and lighter, as the cylinder head assembly was not as large.

A company in the UK called Roton Engine Developments made some progress in 2005 with a two-rotor (one for inlet and one for exhaust) single-cylinder Husaberg motorcycle engine. They filed patents and got an example running in 2006, but were backed by MG Rover which subsequently went bust, leaving Roton without enough funds to continue. The designs surfaced some years later in Australia with Engine Developments Australia Pty Ltd. A prototype casting was produced in 2013 on a Kawasaki Ninja 300 parallel twin unit. This unit is still in development phase at the time of writing but is significant as it has the potential to run much higher compression ratios than even other rotary valve engines due to a significant but undisclosed new cooling method of the combustion chamber and the ability to eliminate the throttle completely, making it vastly more economical at lower engine speeds, so it is claimed.

A proven completely successful automotive rotary valve engine has been built by the late Ralph Ogden Watson of Auckland New Zealand, during 1989. The car has covered many trouble free miles from that date and remains in use.  Success was achieved as a result of Watson's academic approach to the problem of sealing, his study of previous designs, and his particular combination of knowledge of materials, machining skills, experience with engines, perseverance and realistic expectations. No new or only recently available materials were involved. Full details of the development of the car and engine appear in the book "Ralph Watson Special Engineer," first published 2004, ISBN O-476-01371-2 and available free and easily searchable, on the internet as of 2020. The car is currently owned by Ray Ferner.

Two-stroke engines
A rotary valve in the form of a flat disc, also known as a disc valve is widely used in two-stroke motorcycle engines, where the arrangement helps to prevent reverse flow back into the intake port during the compression stroke.

Austrian engine manufacturer Rotax used rotary intake valves in their now out-of-production  Rotax 532 two-stroke engine design and continues to use rotary intake valves in the 532's successor, the current-production  Rotax 582.

Use in production engines
UK company RCV Engines Ltd uses rotating cylinder liner technology as a specialized form of rotary valve in some of their four-stroke model engine and small-engine line-up.  RCV also use horizontal and vertical rotary valves in four-stroke engines in their current range of engines.

RCV have developed a 125cc rotating cylinder liner engine, incorporating a rotating valve in the cylinder liner, for scooter applications. PGO Scooters of Taiwan were working with RCV in developing the engine for their applications.

The Suzuki RG500 "Gamma" was powered by a two-stroke, rotary valve, twin crank, square four engine displacing 498 cubic centimeters. The power output was 93.7 brake horsepower (69.9 kW) at 9,500 RPM.

Use in chromatography
Rotary valves are used for loading samples on columns used for liquid or gas chromatography. The valves used in these methods are usually 6-port, 2-position rotary valves.

See also

 Airlock
 Itala cars
 Piston valve
 Poppet valve
 Rotary feeder
 Slide valve

References

Valves
Brass instrument parts and accessories